Shooting at the Moon is a short Super-8 punk/Remodernist film directed by Jesse Richards and Nicholas Watson, starring Matthew Quinn Martin (billed as Matthew Martin) as Buddy and Leila Laaraj as Lana, and features music by Billy Childish. It was shot in the summer of 1998 and its final cut was completed in 2003. The film premiered at the New York International Independent Film and Video Festival in November 2003. On March 8, 2008 the film made its London premiere at Horse Hospital during their FLIXATION Underground Cinema event.

External links
 Review in FILM THREAT
 Original 2000 edit of Shooting at the Moon

 Shooting at the Moon on YouTube

2003 films
2003 short films
Punk films
2000s English-language films
American rock music films
American short films
2000s American films